Mohammad Modarres (born 11 August 1952) is an Iranian American scientist and educator in the fields of nuclear and reliability engineering. He is a Distinguished Scholar-Teacher and Nicole Y. Kim Eminent Professor of the University of Maryland. Within the University of Maryland A. James Clark School of Engineering, Modarres founded world's first graduate curriculum in reliability engineering, which has now become a leading academic program both nationally and internationally with over 400 Master's and PhD graduates.  As the Director of the UMD Center for Risk and Reliability, Modarres serves as international expert on reliability and risk analysis to various commercial and government organizations including US DOE, US NRC, NASA. A PhD graduate of the Massachusetts Institute of Technology, from the scientific school of Norman C. Rasmussen, he has authored numerous books and hundreds of scholarly papers in the fields of nuclear and reliability engineering.

Selected books 
 Probabilistic Physics of Failure Approach to Reliability: Modeling, Accelerated Testing, Prognosis and Reliability Assessment, Mohammad Modarres, Mehdi Amiri, Christopher Jackson, New York – London: Wiley, March 2017.
 Reliability Engineering and Risk Analysis: A Practical Guide, 3rd edition, Mohammad Modarres, Mark Kaminskiy, Vasiliy Krivtsov, CRC Press (Taylor & Francis Group), 2016. [1st edition 1999, 2nd edition 2010]
 Risk Analysis in Engineering: Probabilistic Techniques, Tools and Trends, Mohammad Modarres, New York – London – Boca Raton: CRC Press (Taylor & Francis Group), 2006.
 Commercial Nuclear Power: Assuring Safety for the Future, Charles Ramsey and Mohammad Modarres, New York – London: Wiley, 1998.
 What Every Engineer Should Know About: Reliability and Risk Analysis, Mohammad Modarres, Marcel Dekker, New York, N.Y., 1993.

References

External links

University of Maryland, College Park faculty
Living people
American people of Iranian descent
American engineers
1951 births